Nagano may refer to:

Places
 Nagano Prefecture, a prefecture in Japan
 Nagano (city), the capital city of the same prefecture
 Nagano 1998, the 1998 Winter Olympics
 Nagano Olympic Stadium, a baseball stadium in Nagano
 Nagano University, a private university in Nagano
 Kawachi-Nagano, a city in Osaka prefecture

Transportation
 Nagano Electric Railway, a railway in Nagano, Japan
 Nagano Station, a railway station in Nagano, Japan
 Nagano Interchange, a road interchange of the Jōshin-etsu Expressway in Nagano, Japan
 Hokuriku Shinkansen, originally Nagano Shinkansen, a high-speed Japanese railway
 Nagano Line (Kintetsu), a railway in Osaka, Japan
 Kawachinagano Station, a railway station in Kawachi-Nagano, Osaka, Japan

Surname 
 Nagano (surname)

See also

Nagorno-Karabakh, a region in the South Caucasus